Tatyana Parfenova (born 1 June 1985 in Kyzylorda) is a handball player from Kazakhstan. She plays on the Kazakhstan women's national handball team and participated at 2008 Summer Olympics in Beijing, the 2010 Asian Games, and the 2011 World Women's Handball Championship in Brazil.

References

External links
 

1985 births
Living people
People from Kyzylorda
Kazakhstani female handball players
Handball players at the 2008 Summer Olympics
Olympic handball players of Kazakhstan
Handball players at the 2010 Asian Games
Handball players at the 2014 Asian Games
Handball players at the 2018 Asian Games
Asian Games bronze medalists for Kazakhstan
Asian Games medalists in handball
Medalists at the 2014 Asian Games
21st-century Kazakhstani women